"A Girl Like Emmylou" is a song recorded by American country music group Southern Pacific.  It was released in August 1986 as the first single from the album Killbilly Hill.  The song reached number 17 on the Billboard Hot Country Singles & Tracks chart.  It was written by group members Tim Goodman, John McFee, Stu Cook and Keith Knudsen.

Chart performance

References

1986 singles
1986 songs
Southern Pacific (band) songs
Song recordings produced by Jim Ed Norman
Songs written by John McFee
Songs written by Tim Goodman
Songs written by Stu Cook
Warner Records singles